SPC may refer to:

Business and law
 Segregated Portfolio Company, a specialized form of offshore company
 Signature panel code, a credit or debit card security code
 Social Purpose Corporation, a company that considers social issues in its decision making
 Special Purpose Company, a subsidiary usually created solely for isolating a financial risk, or for financial reporting reasons
 Statistical Process Control, a method of quality control
Student Police Cadet Project Is Kerala Police Organization
 Supplementary Protection Certificate, a sui generis, patent-like, intellectual property right

Organisations

Businesses
 Shepparton Preserving Company, a brand of jams and tinned goods founded in Shepparton, Victoria, Australia
 Singapore Petroleum Company, a Singapore area oil company
 Southern Pacific Communications, predecessor of American telecommunications provider Sprint Corporation
 Software Publishing Corporation, a former U.S. computer software manufacturer
 Sony Pictures Classics, a speciality division of Sony Pictures Entertainment
 SPC Group, a Korean food company from Samlip Group
 Synthetic Plastics Company, a defunct plastics manufacturer that owned many budget-price record labels
 Syrian Petroleum Company, a state-owned oil company
 System Planning Corporation, a U.S. military electronics corporation

Churches
 Serbian Orthodox Church, an Eastern Orthodox Christian Church
 Southern Presbyterian Church (Australia)

Government and politics
 Pacific Community, formerly the South Pacific Commission, a Pacific Islands regional intergovernmental organisation
 Supreme Petroleum Council (Kuwait), one of the governmental agencies of Kuwait
 Socialist Party of Canada
 Socialist Party of British Columbia
 Supreme People's Court (disambiguation), highest judicial body in several countries
Student Police Cadet Project

Schools
 San Pedro College, a Catholic institution in Davao City, Philippines
 San Pedro College of Business Administration, a private institute in Laguna, Philippines
 St Patrick's College (disambiguation), various institutions
 Saint Paul's College (disambiguation), various institutions
 St Peter's College (disambiguation), various institutions
 St. Petersburg College, a community college with multiple campuses in Pinellas County, Florida, U.S.
 South Plains College, a community college based in Levelland, Texas

Other organizations
 Swedish Paralympic Committee, the non-profit organization representing Swedish athletes in the International Paralympic Committee
Sisters of Charity of St. Paul, Religious congregation founded by St Paul

Police and military
 Scalable Plate Carrier, a ballistic vest or bullet-resistant vest, often called a bulletproof vest
 Specialist (rank), one of the four junior enlisted ranks in the U.S. Army
 Special Purpose Cartridge, a rifle cartridge developed by Remington and the US military
 Special police constable
Student Police Cadet Project

Science and technology
 Secure multiparty computation, a cryptography problem introduced in 1982
 Service Programming Code, a code in most CDMA handsets/mobiles
 Signal peptidase I, an enzyme
 Signaling Point Code, used for SS7 signaling protocol in telephony systems
 Simple Point Charge, a 3-point water model used in computational chemistry simulations
 Sodium percarbonate, an oxidizing agent used in cleaning products
 SPC file format, a file format used in spectroscopy
 SPC700, a processor used for audio in the Super NES hardware
 Stage Pin Connector, a standard power cable connector
 Statistical Process Control, a method for achieving quality control in manufacturing processes
 Storage Performance Council, a non-profit corporation founded to define, standardize, and promote storage subsystem benchmarks; see IBM SAN Volume Controller
 Stored program control, a machine control principle that uses a computer to store programs and data
 Storm Prediction Center, a division of NOAA's National Weather Service that deals with strong to severe weather events
 Summary of Product Characteristics, the defining information document for medicinal products used in the European Union
 SupraPubic Catheter, used to drain urine from the bladder

Other
 IATA code "SPC" for La Palma Airport, Canary Islands
Scrabble Players Championship, an annual Scrabble championship event in North America
 South Pacific Championship (1986–1990), a rugby union competition for Australia, New Zealand and Fiji
 Southwest Preparatory Conference, an athletic league in Texas and Oklahoma, US
 Student Price Card, a loyalty card program in Canada

See also
 SPOC (disambiguation)
SCP (disambiguation)